Aeolotrocha delograpta is a species of moth in the family Gelechiidae. It was described by Anthonie Johannes Theodorus Janse in 1960. It is found in South Africa.

References

Endemic moths of South Africa
Aeolotrocha
Moths described in 1960
Moths of Africa